Cecilia LW Chan is a Chinese social scientist, currently the Si Yuan Professor in Health and Social Work at University of Hong Kong.

References

Year of birth missing (living people)
Living people
University of Hong Kong
Hong Kong social scientists
Alumni of the University of Hong Kong